İtitala is a village and municipality in the Balakan District of Azerbaijan. It has a population of 2,115.

References 

Populated places in Balakan District